Esther Aghatise (born 15 April 1985) is a Nigerian long jumper.

Competition record

External links
 2006 Commonwealth Games profile 

1985 births
Living people
Nigerian female long jumpers
Athletes (track and field) at the 2002 Commonwealth Games
Athletes (track and field) at the 2006 Commonwealth Games
Commonwealth Games competitors for Nigeria
African Games gold medalists for Nigeria
African Games medalists in athletics (track and field)
Athletes (track and field) at the 2003 All-Africa Games